Bavon Tshibuabua  (born July 17, 1991 in Antwerp) is a Congolese footballer who plays for Belgian side RFCB Sprimont.

Career
Tshibuabua began his career in summer 2008 in the youth side for Standard Liège and signed on 20 July 2009 a three years contract with K.F.C. Germinal Beerschot, he played his debut on 22 August 2009 against KV Mechelen. Tshibuabua joined to Újpest FC on 26 June 2012 to three years.

On 6 September 2019, Tshibuabua joined Belgian club RFCB Sprimont.

Honours
Újpest
Hungarian Cup (1): 2013–14

References

External links
 Footgoal Profile

1991 births
Living people
Footballers from Antwerp
Belgian people of Democratic Republic of the Congo descent
Democratic Republic of the Congo footballers
Democratic Republic of the Congo international footballers
Association football forwards
Standard Liège players
Újpest FC players
Nemzeti Bajnokság I players
Democratic Republic of the Congo expatriate footballers
Expatriate footballers in Hungary
Democratic Republic of the Congo expatriate sportspeople in Hungary